Agonidium comoricum is a species of ground beetle in the subfamily Platyninae. It was described by Basilewsky in 1985.

References

comoricum
Beetles described in 1985